神田駅 is the name of multiple train stations in Japan:

 Kanda Station (disambiguation)
 Kanda Station (Tokyo)
 Kōda Station (disambiguation)
 Kōda Station (Saza)